End in Tears (2005) is a novel by English crime writer Ruth Rendell, the twentieth in her acclaimed Inspector Wexford series.

Synopsis
When a lump of concrete is thrown from a bridge and into passing traffic one dark night, the wrong motorist dies. The killer soon rectifies his mistake, however, and Inspector Wexford finds himself under attack from the local press because of his 'old-fashioned' policing methods. Meanwhile, the difficult relationship he shares with his daughter Sylvia takes on new dimensions, as the case makes him ponder the terrible possibility of losing a child...

Reception
The novel was very well received by critics, and in 2007 received a nomination for the Theakston's Old Peculier Crime Novel of the Year Award.

2005 British novels
Novels by Ruth Rendell
Hutchinson (publisher) books
Inspector Wexford series